Grand Chancellor may refer to:

 Grand Chancellor, a senior governmental post under an emperor, monarch or president
 Grand chancellor (China), an official in the imperial Chinese government
 Grand Chancellor of Denmark, a historic Danish title
 Grand Chancellor of France, an officer in the Ancien Régime
 Grand Chancellor of the Crown, one of the highest officials in historic Poland
 Hotel Grand Chancellor, a hotel chain in Australia and New Zealand

See also 
 Archchancellor or chief chancellor, the highest dignitary of the Holy Roman Empire